is a Ryukyuan gusuku in Itoman, Okinawa.

References

External links

Gushikawa Castle Photos - Flick River
Gushikawa Ruins Cape Kyan - Okinawa Hai
Exploring Okinawa - Cape Kyan's Gushikawa Castle - Haisai Akage
Gushikawa Castle Remains - Okinawa Film Office
 Gushikawa Castle Ruins - Itoman City
Gushikawa Castle Ruins - Ryukyu Cultural Archives
  Gushikawa Castle (Itoman City)

Castles in Okinawa Prefecture
Itoman, Okinawa